Kamenice nad Lipou is a town in Pelhřimov District in the Vysočina Region of the Czech Republic. It has about 3,600 inhabitants. The historic town centre is well preserved and is protected by law as an urban monument zone.

Administrative parts

Villages of Antonka, Březí, Gabrielka, Johanka, Nová Ves, Pravíkov and Vodná are administrative parts of Kamenice nad Lipou.

Geography
It lies in the Křemešník Highlands, on the Kamenice river. The area is rich on small ponds.

History
The first written mention of Kamenice is from 1267. It was founded as a settlement below a castle in the early 13th century. In honor of a linden tree planted in the castle garden in 1248, the settlement added nad Lipou (meaning "above a linden tree") into its name.

Kamenice nad Lipou regularly changed its owners, who belonged more to the lower nobles. Notable was the rule of Jan of Šelmberk in 1476–1497, during which Kamenice obtained various rights and privileges, and the Malovec family, which had the Gothic castle rebuilt in the Renaissance style in 1580–1583. In 1623, the manor was bought by the family of Paradies of Escheide, which owned it for 70 years and oppressed the inhabitants and deprived the town of its privileges.

The town economically prospered in the 18th and 19th centuries. In the first half of the 18th century, silver and iron ores were mined and subsequently hammer mills were founded. In 1839, a wool classing workshop was set up in one of the castle's wings. In 1875, glassworks replaced the hammer mills. In 1906, the narrow-gauge railway was built.

Transport
Kamenice nad Lipou lies on a narrow-gauge railway leading from Jindřichův Hradec to Obrataň. It is operated by Jindřichohradecké místní dráhy company. It serves mostly as a tourist attraction.

Sights

The most notable sight is the Kamenice nad Lipou Castle. Its current appearance is from 1842, when it was rebuilt in the Neoclassical style. Today it is owned by the Museum of Applied Arts in Prague, which has a depository here, and an exhibition for the public. The southern wing serves as the town museum. The castle includes an English park. The 700–800 years old linden tree after which the town was named is still in the park.

Notable people
Vítězslav Novák (1870–1949), composer 
Ella Tvrdková (1878–1918), opera singer

See also
100728 Kamenice n Lipou, an asteroid named in honor of the town

References

External links

Populated places in Pelhřimov District
Cities and towns in the Czech Republic